Alexander Mitrofanovich Ostroumov (Ostroumoff) (1859 in Moscow –1920 in Constantinople) born into a middle-class family, was a Russian pharmaceutical chemist, perfume and cosmetics maker. He invented the anti-dandruff soap, which enabled him to open his own perfume and medicinal cosmetics factory and was the founder of the Moscow Institute of Medical Cosmetics, the first of its kind in the world.

Professional activity

Ostroumov entered the business as an ordinary pharmaceutical chemist and referred to himself as such even at the peak of his career as the path to becoming a professional pharmacist was very difficult. Ostroumov worked as an apprentice for three years whilst completing a university degree in Moscow. Once he completed his degree he had to work in a pharmacy for three years before being admitted to a two-year degree at Moscow University, which, upon graduation, led to him becoming a full-fledged pharmaceutical chemist. After he creating the anti-dandruff soap in 1885, he invested in research and experimentation in order to create acne lotions, skin lightening products, and anti-aging creams. In 1900 the Perfume Factory Partnership of Pharmacist A. M. Ostroumov was established. Ostroumov, making use of advances in chemical and technological equipment, invented the cream "Metamorphozis", designed to get rid of freckles, age spots and protect against severe sunburn, which quickly became the favorite of Russian beauties and brought him fame.

In 1909, Ostroumov established a laboratory on Tverskaya Street in Moscow, which grew into the Institute of Medical Cosmetics and him becoming the father of Russian cosmetology. In the Moscow Institute of Medical Cosmetics, Ostroumov worked on the prevention and treatment of skin and hair diseases where there were devices for electrolysis, electronic sinus vibration massage, steam, dry air and light baths and showers for sagging skin, rosacea removal, wrinkle, pimple, blackhead freckle treatment, sunburn and other disease treatments.

Marketing and advertising strategy 

In 1912, the Moscow Institute of Medical Cosmetics A. M. Ostroumov published an album of promotional photos with autographed notes entitled "Our Artists" ("Nashi artistki"). The album was printed in 1912 at the A. I. Mamontov Printing House in Moscow and the artists photographs were taken by  Karl  A. Fischer, the photographer of the Russian Imperial House.

The Ostroumov company employed local stars for their "artists" which fitted in with their narrative of transformative beauty to gain an advantage over their foreign competitors. Among the artists featured was Elisaveta Azerskaya from the Bolshoi Theatre (before the October Revolution it was a part of the Imperial Theatres), who welcomed Ostroumov’s perfumery, calling it a serious rival of foreign perfumeries. Wearing an elegant dress, dramatic soprano Leonida Balanovskaya issued the following statement: Since I have become familiar with chemist Ostroumov’s 'Cream No.2', I have understood the importance of choosing the right cosmetics. The amazing effect of this cream on the skin is incomparably superior to all other creams.
Some singers have been shown in character costumes reminiscent of the product names they are praising. Photographed as Cio-Cio-San from "Madame Butterfly" by Giacomo Puccini, the Zimin Opera soprano Vera Liutse opined: The unusually delicate and natural aroma of Ostroumov’s  'Japanese Lilac'… reminds me of the native land of this flower, the land of the rising sun and flowers. Based on Liutse’s image and text, "Japanese Lilac" alludes to Puccini’s popular opera and heroine with the image of Liutse in the kimono of the foreign Cio-Cio-San providing a sense of the exotic. Other Ostroumov products shared the names of opera characters and were more directly associated with celebrities and their distinctive roles. Star Bolshoi soprano Antonina Nezhdanova, who appeares as the heroine oft the same name in Léo Delibes’s opera "Lakmé", explained that she likes the perfumes of the Ostroumov company very much, especially the soap, cologne and powder 'Lakme'.

Ostroumov kept the recipes secret by splitting them into three parts with references to each other with each part kept in a different place. It was necessary to have all three parts in order to understand the full recipe and to be able to manufacture the product.

Zenith and downfall

The quality of the manufactured products was core to their appeal and helped A. M. Ostroumov to continue to grow which required new warehouses in Saint Petersburg, Odessa, Yalta, Tashkent and Warsaw as the partnership’s  products became widely sold and A. M. Ostroumov become purveyor to the court of the Russian imperial family which gave them the right to put the state seal on its products. Around 1912 his perfume factory was the largest Russian-owned perfume factory in Imperial Russia with a large variety of products from anti-dandruff soap and medical cosmetics to creams and perfumes. In the factory price list there are hundred names of colognes, including "Chypre", "Lily of the Valley", "Jasmine", "Ideal", "Japanese Lilac", "Empress's Bouquet", "Artist's Cologne" or perfumes like "Fresh Hey", "Vera-Violet" and "Oridis".

After the Russian February Revolution, on  the Russian Emperor Nicholas II abdicated and on  the Russian Provisional Government, headed by the Social-Revolutionary Prime Minister Alexander Kerensky, proclaimed the Russian Republic. The business of the Ostroumov company was still going well but on  the Bolsheviks seized power in Saint Petersburg.

In 1920, when the front of the Civil War reached Crimea, Ostroumov fled to Constantinople with his youngest daughter Olga and her husband Nikolai Baron von Stempel where he died of a heart attach shortly afterwards. His body was returned to Crimea and buried in Yalta.

References

General sources
 

 Ostroumov, Alexander, Our Artists (Nashi Artistki), Moscow: Typography Partnership A. I. Mamontov, 1912
 Olga A. Baronin von Stempel (youngest daughter of A. M. Ostroumov): Memoirs, unpublished manuscript kept in family archive Rascanu - Ostroumov, Mühlheim / Main, Germany
 
 
 
 

1859 births
1920 deaths
Chemists from the Russian Empire
History of cosmetics
19th-century chemists
Scientists from Moscow
Perfumers